Alokeranjan Dasgupta (6 October 1933 – 17 November 2020) was a Bengali poet who was the author of over 20 books of poetry. He translated Bengali and Santal poetry and plays into English and German, and also translated literature from German and French into Bengali. He also published a number of books of essays, and was well known for his distinctive prose style.

Education 
Dasgupta was born in 1933 in Kolkata. He studied at Visva-Bharati, Santiniketan, and then at St. Xavier's College, the Presidency College, and finally at the University of Calcutta, gaining a Ph.D. for his studies on the lyric in Indian poetry. He used also to be associated vigorously with the little magazines and translate the original German works into Bengali.

Career 
After completing his Ph.D., Dasgupta taught comparative literature and Bengali at the Department of Comparative Literature (founded by Buddhadeva Bose) at Jadavpur University from 1957 until 1971, when he went to Germany on a Humboldt Foundation Fellowship. Since 1971, he taught at the faculty of the South Asia Institute of the University of Heidelberg, Germany. He was closely associated with the Deutsche-Indische Gessellschaft (DIG), which is a premier institution for promoting close links between India and Germany.

A poet much admired by his fellow poets and the wannabes, his poetry is known for both thematic and technical innovations. The German government felicitated him for his contribution to bring together two different cultures together by awarding him the Goethe Medal in 1985.

Awards 
Dasgupta received many awards and honors including the Sudha Basu award from the University of Calcutta (1983), the Goethe Prize in Germany (1985), the Ananda Purashkar (1985), the Pravasi Bharatiya Samman (1985), the Rabindra Puraskar (1987), the Sahitya Akademi Award (1992) for his book of poems Marami Karat (translated as The Mystical Saw and Other Poems) and the Pravasi Bharatiya Samman (2005).

Bibliography 

 Saranarthir Ritu O Shilpa Bhabna, Ananda Publishers, 1993. .
 Bhramane Nay Bhubane, Ananda Publishers. .
 Chayapathera Sandra Samlapika, Ananda Publishers. .
 Ekhanao Nameni, Bandhu, Niukliyara sitera Godhuli, Ananda Publishers. .
 Jvarera Ghore Taraju Kempe Yaya
 Samabayi silpera Garaje
 Tushara Jure Trisulacihna
 Problems of Translation from South Asian Languages (by Universitat Heidelberg, Alokeranjan Dasgupta)
 The Lyric In Indian Poetry (1962)
 The Mystical Saw and Other Poems (by Roland Hindmarsh, Sahitya Akademi, Alokeranjan Dasgupta) (1996)
 Satabarshikira alochayaya (2000)
 The Shadow of a Kite and Other Essays (2004)
 Alo Aro Alo (Collection of poems) (Abhijan Publishers, 2009)
 Se Ki Khunje Pelo Iswerkana (Collection of poems) (Abhijan Publishers, 2012)
 Nirishwar Pakhider Upasonalaye (Collection of poems) (Abhijan Publishers, 2013)
 Ekhon Nabhonil Amar Tahabil (Collection of poems) (Abhijan Publishers, 2014)

References

20th-century Indian poets
20th-century Bengali poets
Bengali Hindus
1933 births
2020 deaths
20th-century Bengalis
21st-century Bengalis
Bengali male poets
Bengali poets
Bengali writers
Translators from German
Translators to Bengali
Translators from Bengali
Indian poets
Indian translators
Indian male poets
Indian male writers
Indian male essayists
20th-century Indian translators
21st-century Indian translators
20th-century Indian writers
21st-century Indian writers
20th-century Indian male writers
21st-century Indian male writers
21st-century Indian poets
20th-century Indian essayists
21st-century Indian essayists
Academic staff of Jadavpur University
Recipients of the Sahitya Akademi Award in Bengali
Recipients of the Ananda Purashkar
Poets from West Bengal
Visva-Bharati University alumni
University of Calcutta alumni
Writers from Kolkata
Recipients of Pravasi Bharatiya Samman